James Dorsey may refer to:

Jimmy Dorsey (1904–1957), American jazz musician and big band leader
Jimmie Dorsey (sport shooter) (born 1940), American sport shooter
James Owen Dorsey (1848–1895), American anthropologist
Jim Dorsey (born 1955), Major League Baseball pitcher